Egna is a studio album by the French progressive rock band Ange. It was released in 1986.

Track listing
Side One:
"C'est Après Coup Que Ça Fait Mal"  – 04:45
"Fais Pas La Gueule !"  – 04:40
"Revoir Les Sorcières De Salem"  – 03:25
"Les Dessins Animés"  – 03:05
Side Two:
"Cœur De Paille, Cœur De Pierre"  – 04:08
"Le Dernier Romantique"  – 04:20
"Le Cul Qui Jazze"  – 05:50
"Tout Comme Dans Un Livre"  – 05:27

Personnel
 Male Vocals: Christian Decamps
 Keyboards: Francis "Didou" Decamps
 Guitar: Serge "Doudou" Cuenot
 Bass: Laurent Sigrist
 Drums, Percussion: Jean-Claude Potin
 Female Vocal: Martine Kesselburg

Additional Musicians
 Programmation: Bernard Torelli
 Litter And Menus: Auberge Bretonne

References
Egna on ange-updlm 
Egna on www.discogs.com

Ange albums
1986 albums